Peter J. Nordlander is a Swedish physicist.

Career 

Nordlander completed a doctorate in theoretical physics at Chalmers University of Technology. Following postdoctoral research at Thomas J. Watson Research Center, Bell Labs, and Rutgers University, Nordlander began teaching at Rice University in 1989. He works within the Laboratory for Nanophotonics at Rice, and serves as the Wiess Chair and Professor of Physics and Astronomy.

Recognition 
Nordlander was elected to fellowship of the American Physical Society in 2002 "for pioneering contributions to the chemical physics of atom-surface interactions, including the development of a many-body theoretical description of charge transfer processes in atom-surface scattering." He is also a fellow of SPIE, the American Association for the Advancement of Science and the Optical Society. Nordlander was one of three recipients of the Willis E. Lamb Award in 2013, "for pioneering theoretical contributions in the field of plasmonics" alongside Shaul Mukamel and Susanne Yelin. Nordlander, Naomi Halas, and Tony Heinz won the 2014 Frank Isakson Prize for Optical Effects in Solids awarded by the American Physical Society. Nordlander and Halas shared a second award in 2015, the Optical Society's R. W. Wood Prize. In 2016, Nordlander was listed an ISI highly cited researcher.

References

20th-century Swedish physicists
21st-century Swedish physicists
Swedish expatriates in the United States
Fellows of the American Association for the Advancement of Science
Fellows of the American Physical Society
Fellows of Optica (society)
Fellows of SPIE
Year of birth missing (living people)
Chalmers University of Technology alumni
Rice University faculty
Swedish nanotechnologists
Living people